The Bowie hotspot is a volcanic hotspot, located  west of Haida Gwaii in the Pacific Ocean.

Almost all magma created by the hotspot has the composition of basalt, and so the volcanoes are constructed almost entirely of this igneous rock. The eruptions from the Bowie hotspot are effusive eruptions because basaltic magma is relatively fluid compared with magmas typically involved in more explosive eruptions, such as the andesitic magmas that produce some of the spectacular and dangerous eruptions around the margins of the Pacific Ocean.

It is also considerably weak.

Eruptions from the Bowie hotspot have left a trail of underwater mountains across the Pacific, called the Kodiak-Bowie Seamount chain, which is an underwater mountain region of seamounts along a line beneath the northern Pacific Ocean. The oldest volcano in the chain is Kodiak Seamount with an estimated age of 24 million years and the youngest called Bowie Seamount.

Geological studies show that the base of Bowie Seamount formed less than a million years ago. The summit of Bowie Seamount is even younger and shows signs of having been active as recently as 18,000 years ago. Because of its shallow depth, some geologists believe Bowie Seamount was an active volcanic island throughout last ice age.

See also
Volcanism in Canada
Geology of the Pacific Northwest
Cobb hotspot

References

Hotspots of the Pacific Ocean
Volcanism of British Columbia